The Mayor of Ōtorohanga officiates over the Ōtorohanga District of New Zealand's North Island. The County of Otorohanga was established in 1971, becoming a district council in 1979.

Max Baxter is the current mayor of Ōtorohanga. He was elected in 2013 and reelected in 2016.

List of mayors

References

Otorohanga
Mayors of places in Waikato
Ōtorohanga District